The Mitsubishi Toppo is a light recreational vehicle (RV) produced by Mitsubishi Motors from 1990 until 2004 and then from 2008 until 2013. The original version was derived from their Minica kei car. The name is a portmanteau of the English "top" (roof) and the Japanese "noppo" (lanky).

Originally named the Mitsubishi Minica Toppo, a retro-styled variant was introduced in 1996 called the Mitsubishi Minica Toppo Town Bee. In 1998 a new generation was launched; now referred to as the Mitsubishi Toppo BJ ("Big Joy"). A larger derivative, the Mitsubishi Toppo BJ Wide was introduced in 1999. The model was replaced by the new eK in 2001, although it was sold alongside the eK until being discontinued in 2004. The Toppo was reintroduced in 2008; now referred to simply as the Mitsubishi Toppo. In Japan, it was sold at a specific retail chain called Galant Shop.



Minica Toppo (first generation)

Based on the Minica, the tall three-door MPV model was introduced in February 1990. While Kei car standards had been altered for 1990, allowing for a  increase in length and an increase in displacement to 660 cc, the Toppo, being developed before the new regulations were finalized, was unable to take full advantage of these and ended up  shorter than other kei cars. This was rectified along with a minor facelift in January 1992. The Minica Toppo only ever received the new 657 cc 3G83 engine, with optional four-wheel drive. The Minica Toppo was available both as a commercial vehicle and as a better equipped passenger model. The car's body is asymmetric, with the left (offside) door being longer than the driver's side door to provide better entry to the rear seat from the safer side of the car.

The most basic "Toppo C" was a strict two-seater with blanked out rear side windows, equipped with a four-speed manual and a minimum of equipment. In the original commercial vehicle lineup, the C was accompanied by the U, U2, and the four-wheel drive U2-4 models. The introductory passenger version lineup started with the lowest priced B, followed by the Q, the Q2, and the four-wheel drive Q2-4.

Model codes are H22A/H27A for the passenger models, H22V/H27V for van models. H22 is front-wheel drive, H27 is four-wheel drive. Van models were uncatalyzed until May 1991.

In late October 1990, the Minica Toppo Q坊 (Q-Bo) special edition based on the Toppo Q2 was released; 2,000 units went on sale. Aside from various special equipment such as power steering, power windows, a rooftop spoiler, fog lamps, and special interior fabrics, the Q坊 received two-tone paint in two different combinations: San Marino Yellow with Sophia White roof, or Ivy Green with a Pearl White roof. The Q坊 became a recurring special edition, being re-released with minor alterations in August 1991 (now based on the better equipped Q3 and with a 6-disc CD changer), August 1992, and ultimately in May 1993. The last edition Q坊 was also available with four-wheel drive. Another special edition was the Minica Toppo Flower Express of March 1991, a two-seater van with blanked rear side windows especially aimed at florists.

In January 1992, the Toppo (as well as the Minica) was modified, mainly to meet new safety regulations. The passenger car models benefitted from side impact protection in the doors, steering wheel locks, seat belt reminders, non-asbestos gaskets, and more. Some models received 3-point belts in the rear seats as well, not a standard item in kei cars until the end of the decade. The grille, bumpers, headlights, and seat fabrics were new. The Toppo also received an opening rear gate window and a protrusion on the rear bumper which served as a step. The new Canvas Top was available on the turbocharged Qt as well as on the naturally aspirated Qc.

Production of the Minica Toppo ended in September 1993 as a new version was introduced; however, the new model continued to use the rear bodywork of the first Minica Toppo coupled with the new front and underpinnings of the new seventh generation Minica, effectively making it a thorough facelift.

Minica Toppo (second generation)
The second generation Toppo was sold from 1993 to 1998. Being essentially as extensive facelift of the first generation model.

Mitsubishi Toppo (third generation)
The third generation Toppo was sold from 1998 to 2003.

Mitsubishi Toppo (fourth generation)
The fourth generation Toppo was sold from 2008 to 2013.

In popular culture
The AWD Toppo appears alongside several of its kei car contemporaries in Kat's Run: Zen-Nippon K Car Senshuken for the Super Famicom.

References

Toppo
2000s cars
All-wheel-drive vehicles
Front-wheel-drive vehicles
Kei cars
Cars introduced in 1990
Cars discontinued in 2013